General elections were held in Nicaragua on 6 December 1914 to elect a president and Senate.

References

Nicaragua
1914 in Nicaragua
Elections in Nicaragua
Presidential elections in Nicaragua
December 1914 events
Election and referendum articles with incomplete results